The Irish Downloads Chart is a chart compiled by the Irish Recorded Music Association to measure the downloads of individual tracks from a number of online stores. Its current contributors are downloadmusic.ie, iTunes, Eircom Music Club, Vodafone, Sony Connect, Bleep, Wippit, easyMusic and 3ireland. In addition to its own chart, the downloads used to compile the Downloads Chart, also are added to physical single sales (i.e. they are used to determine Singles Chart positions). The chart is currently compiled to the Top 20

However, beginning in 2007, the singles chart was changed to accommodate all downloads, meaning that a song released outside the traditional New Releases bracket will now be taken into account in the singles chart if it qualifies within the top 40. The first example of this was the single "Chasing Cars" by Snow Patrol re-entered the Top 40 in the first chart of 2007 at Number 8, despite the single being released in August 2006. These new rules also applies for Album releases as well.

External links 
Most recent downloads chart 

Downloads